Mohammad Sharifullah (born 30 July 1986) is a Bangladeshi cricketer in first-class and List A and Twenty20 cricket. He made his debut for Dhaka Division.

References

1986 births
Living people
Bangladeshi cricketers
Dhaka Division cricketers
Sylhet Division cricketers
Legends of Rupganj cricketers
Kala Bagan Krira Chakra cricketers
Dhaka Metropolis cricketers
Chittagong Division cricketers
Bangladesh Central Zone cricketers
Sylhet Strikers cricketers
Cricketers from Dhaka
Rupganj Tigers Cricket Club cricketers